Hogenson is a surname. Notable people with the surname include:

Roald A. Hogenson (1913–1987), American judge
William Hogenson (1884–1965), American athlete and sprinter

See also
Hoganson
Neils Hogenson House